Jackson's Gap is a town in Tallapoosa County, Alabama, United States. It incorporated in 1980. At the 2010 census the population was 828, up from 761.

Geography
Jackson's Gap is located in east- central Alabama. It includes land bordering Lake Martin. Jackson's Gap is located at  (32.881670, -85.818582).

History
Jackson's Gap was named for a local settler in the early 19th century.

Demographics

As of the census of 2000, there were 761 people, 294 households, and 206 families residing in the town. The racial makeup of the town was 69.65% White, 29.04% Black or African American, 0.39% Native American, 0.26% Asian, and 0.66% from two or more races. 0.39% of the population were Hispanic or Latino of any race.

There were 294 households, out of which 32.7% had children under the age of 18 living with them, 51.7% were married couples living together, 13.6% had a female householder with no husband present, and 29.9% were non-families. 25.9% of all households were made up of individuals, and 8.5% had someone living alone who was 65 years of age or older. The average household size was 2.59 and the average family size was 3.12.

In the town, the population was spread out, with 27.5% under the age of 18, 7.5% from 18 to 24, 29.4% from 25 to 44, 23.5% from 45 to 64, and 12.1% who were 65 years of age or older. The median age was 36 years. For every 100 females, there were 101.3 males. For every 100 females age 18 and over, there were 92.3 males.

The median income for a household in the town was $23,027, and the median income for a family was $28,335. Males had a median income of $23,679 versus $18,185 for females. The per capita income for the town was $14,712. About 15.9% of families and 25.6% of the population were below the poverty line, including 28.8% of those under age 18 and 33.3% of those age 65 or over.

Gallery

References

Towns in Tallapoosa County, Alabama
Towns in Alabama
Alexander City micropolitan area